Jean-Louis Haillet and Gilles Moretton were the defending champions but only Moretton competed that year with Dominique Bedel.

Bedel and Moretton lost in the quarterfinals to Paolo Bertolucci and Adriano Panatta.

Bertolucci and Panatta won in the final 6–4, 6–4 against Brian Gottfried and Raymond Moore.

Seeds
Champion seeds are indicated in bold text while text in italics indicates the round in which those seeds were eliminated.

 Paolo Bertolucci /  Adriano Panatta (champions)
 Brian Gottfried /  Raymond Moore (final)
 Tom Cain /  Eddie Edwards (semifinals)
 Eric Deblicker /  Christophe Roger-Vasselin (first round)

Draw

External links
 1980 Paris Open Doubles draw

Doubles